The 1939 Allan Cup was the Canadian senior ice hockey championship for the 1938–39 season.

Final 
Best of 5
Port Arthur 6 Montreal 4
Port Arthur 3 Montreal 1
Montreal 6 Port Arthur 4
Port Arthur 6 Montreal 5

Port Arthur Bearcats beat Montreal Royals 3-1 on series.

External links
Allan Cup archives 
Allan Cup website

 
Allan Cup
Allan